Park Si-hwan (born July 30, 1987) is a South Korean singer. He is known as the runner-up of Mnet's Superstar K5. He released his first single, There's Nothing I Can Do on April 10, 2014.

Discography

Studio albums

Extended plays

Singles

Soundtrack appearances

Filmography

Variety show

Television series

Theater

Awards and nominations

References

External links

1987 births
Living people
K-pop singers
South Korean rhythm and blues singers
Superstar K participants
21st-century South Korean  male singers